Barry Dean "Dino" Hackett (born June 28, 1964) is a former American football linebacker in the National Football League who played for the Kansas City Chiefs from 1986 to 1991.

References

1964 births
Living people
American football linebackers
Appalachian State Mountaineers football players
Kansas City Chiefs players
Seattle Seahawks players
American Conference Pro Bowl players
Players of American football from Greensboro, North Carolina
Ed Block Courage Award recipients